David Joy may refer to:

 David Joy (author) (born 1983), American novelist
 David Joy (engineer) (1825–1903), locomotive and marine engineer, designer of the Joy valve gear
 David Joy (footballer) (born 1943), former professional footballer